Turtle: The Incredible Journey is a 2009 documentary film narrated by Miranda Richardson and directed by Nick Stringer. The film was co-produced by MTN Movies and SeaWorld Pictures and Tradewind Pictures, and distributed in the United States by Hannover House.

Plot

A female loggerhead turtle follows the path of her ancestors on one of the most extraordinary journeys in the natural world. From a beach in Florida, she rides the Gulf Stream to the frozen north, swimming around the entire North Atlantic to Africa  and then back to the beach where she was born. But her chance of survival is low.  Each season, two million loggerhead turtles are hatched but just one in ten thousand turtles will return safely to lay their eggs.

Awards
 Australian Cinematographers Society: "Gold Award"
 Australian Cinematographers Society: "President Award"
 Hof Kinderfilmfest: "Audience Award"

References

External links
 
 

Austrian documentary films
2009 films
2009 documentary films
German documentary films
British documentary films
Documentary films about nature
Sea turtles
Films about turtles
2000s British films
2000s German films